The 1991 Atlantic Coast Conference baseball tournament was held in Greenville, SC from May 11 through 14. Clemson won the tournament and earned the Atlantic Coast Conference's automatic bid to the 1991 NCAA Division I baseball tournament.

Seeding

Tournament

All-Tournament Team

(*)Denotes Unanimous Selection

See also
College World Series
NCAA Division I Baseball Championship

References

2007 ACC Baseball Media Guide 

Tournament
Atlantic Coast Conference baseball tournament
Atlantic Coast Conference baseball tournament
Atlantic Coast Conference baseball tournament
College baseball tournaments in South Carolina
Baseball competitions in Greenville, South Carolina